Åfjord Idrettslag is a Norwegian sports club from Åfjord on the peninsula Fosen in Sør-Trøndelag. The club was founded in 1923 and has sections for both association football, team handball, Nordic skiing and athletics. The men's football team plays in the Fifth Division, having last played in the Norwegian Third Division in 2012, while the senior team in the Women's Handball plays in the Third Division.

Former players included Alexander Lund Hansen and Øyvind Svenning, footballers.

Recent seasons

Men
{| 
|valign="top" width=0%|

Women
{| 
|valign="top" width=0%|

References

External links

Football clubs in Norway
Association football clubs established in 1923
1923 establishments in Norway
Sport in Trøndelag
Åfjord